Compass is a 2010 album by Jamie Lidell, released May 18. It is produced by Lidell and features additional production by Beck, Grizzly Bear's Chris Taylor, Lindsey Rome and Robbie Lackritz.

Track listing

Reception

Compass received generally favorable reviews upon its release, earning a rating of 76 out of 100 on review aggregator website Metacritic.

Credits
Jamie Lidell: Production, vocals, vocal effects, beat box, synths, Moog, piano, drum machine, guitar, tambourine, percussion, drums, mixing
Bryan Baird (Feist): Shaker, trumpet, French horn, fugel
Jesse Baird (Feist): Drums, percussion
Chris Bautista: Trumpet
Chris Bear (Grizzly Bear): Drums, percussion, tambourine
Nikka Costa: Vocals
Matt Demeritt: Tenor sax
Leslie Feist: Vocals, shouts, percussion, guitar
James Gadson (Ray Charles, Marvin Gaye): Drums, percussion
Daniel Raymond Gahn: Drums
Chilly Gonzales: Piano
Beck Hansen: Production, guitar, Juno synth, vocals
Robbie Lackritz (Feist): Production
Brian Lebarton (Beck): Percussion, electronic drums, synth, keys, vocals
Carlin Nicholson (Zeus): Bass
Mike O'Brien (Zeus): Guitar
David Ralicke: Trombone, sax
Lindsey Rome: Production, vocals, percussion, design, photos and artwork
Daniel Rossen (Grizzly Bear): Guitar
Dan Rothschild: Bass
Pat Sansone (Wilco): Wurlitzer, bass, rhodes, mellotron, percussion, gongs, celeste, vocals, mallets
Justin Stanley (Beck): Drums, Mexican bass, percussion
Snax: Vocals, synth
Chris Taylor (Grizzly Bear): Production, mixing, bass, synth, guitar, bass clarinet, flute, sax

References

2010 albums
Jamie Lidell albums
Warp (record label) albums